Nupserha atriceps is a species of beetle in the family Cerambycidae. It was described by Stephan von Breuning in 1948.

Varietas
 Nupserha atriceps var. laterifusca Breuning, 1950
 Nupserha atriceps var. assamensis Breuning, 1950
 Nupserha atriceps var. subternigrescens Breuning, 1960

References

atriceps
Beetles described in 1948